Kur Abbaslu (also Romanized as Kūr ‘Abbāslū) is a village in Yurchi-ye Gharbi Rural District, Kuraim District, Nir County, Ardabil Province, Iran. At the 2006 census, its population was 185, in 71 families.

References 

Tageo

Towns and villages in Nir County